Airlangga Sutjipto (born 22 November 1985), simply known as Ronggo is an Indonesian professional footballer who plays as a forward. He played for the Indonesia national football team at the 2007 Southeast Asian Games in Thailand.

Club career

Deltras Sidoarjo 
He started his professional career at Deltras Sidoarjo.

Persib Bandung 
In the 2008/2009 season, Persib recruited him from Deltras. He made his debut when Persib played a match away to Persiwa Wamena. He scored his first goal against Bontang FC in Bontang.

Semen Padang 
On 2014 season, Airlangga joined Semen Padang. Where he scored his first goal against PS Barito Putera.

Mitra Kukar 
In the 2015 Indonesia President's Cup, the club lend Airlangga with his colleague Eka Ramdani, Abdul Gamal, Hendra Bayauw, and Saepulloh Maulana to Mitra Kukar. with Mitra Kukar, he helped his club to 4th place in the tournament after the President's Cup in a match against Arema in a loss 2-0.

Sriwijaya 
In 2016, he was recruited to Sriwijaya F.C. for East Kalimantan Governor Cup tournament in 2016 under coach Benny Dollo. And in the 2016 Indonesia Soccer Championship A, Airlangga made his debut against Mitra Kukar.

References

External links
Airlangga Sutjipto at Soccerway

1985 births
Living people
Indonesian footballers
Indonesia international footballers
Sportspeople from Jakarta
Deltras F.C. players
Persiba Bantul players
Persib Bandung players
Semen Padang F.C. players
Sriwijaya F.C. players
Liga 1 (Indonesia) players
Association football forwards